The Free Software Foundation Europe (FSFE) is an eingetragener Verein (registered voluntary association) incorporated under German law. It was founded in 2001 to support all aspects of the free software movement in Europe, with registered chapters in several European countries. It is the European sister organization of the USbased Free Software Foundation (FSF), although each foundation exists as a separate organization. Following the return of Richard Stallman to the FSF in 2021, the FSFE declared themselves "unable to collaborate" with the FSF.

Goals 
FSFE believes that access to (and control of) software determines who may participate in a digital society. Consequently, FSFE believes, the freedoms to use, copy, modify and redistribute software, as described in The Free Software Definition, are necessary for equal participation in the Information Age. The focus of FSFE's work is political, legal, and social, with the aim of promoting free software and the ethical, philosophical, social, political and commercial values that it implements. In particular, it:
 is actively promoting free software politically as a Europe-based global competence center in dialog with politicians and press.
 follows and seeks to influence legal and political activities that are contrary to the goals and values of Free Software.
 provides a contact point and orientational help on all issues regarding Free Software.
 works closely together with lawyers active in the Free Software area in universities and practices in order to follow and influence the legal discourse. Also it cooperates with lawyers throughout Europe to maximize the legal security of Free Software.
 supports, coordinates and develops projects in the Free Software area, especially the GNU Project. It also provides computer resources to Free Software developers to enable them to continue their developments.
 helps companies to develop business models based on Free Software or fit existing models to it; it encourages companies in their evolution to Free Software. To make it easier for companies based on Free Software to be commercially successful, the FSF Europe also seeks to broaden the market for Free Software.
 helps coordinating and networking other initiatives in the Free Software area.

Example projects 

"Public Money? Public Code!" campaign. In September 2017, FSFE launched the "Public Money? Public Code!" campaign by publishing an open letter signed by other organizations and calling for European and national Members of Parliament to “Implement legislation requiring that publicly financed software developed for the public sector be made publicly available under a Free and Open Source Software license”.  Among the 150 signing organizations (as of July 2018), the campaign is supported by digital rights NGOs like Creative Commons, Open Source Initiative, Electronic Frontier Foundation, EDRi, April, Chaos Computer Club, and national chapters of Wikimedia (Germany, Czech Republic, France and Italy) as well as organizations responsible for the development and maintenance of Free and Open Source Software like OpenSUSE, Fedora, Tor, Debian and Videolan. The campaign was publicly endorsed by more than 18 000 individuals (as of July 2018) including public figures such as Edward Snowden, Francesca Bria (CTO of the city of Barcelona) as well as public administrations like the City of Barcelona.
 Software patents in Europe: According to the FSFE, software patents for Europe are currently being pushed forward actively by a lobby gathering around the European patent office and the Business Software Alliance (BSA), which represents the interests of the largest US companies. Software patents are considered by the FSFE to be a menace to society and economy and FSF Europe is actively involved in the resistance to such plans.
European Union v. Microsoft: In 2001 the European Union, through the DG Competition of the European Commission (led by Prof. Mario Monti), started investigating Microsoft's dominant position in the desktop operating systems. The Free Software Foundation Europe was invited by the EC to represent the stance of the Free Software movement. In 2004 FSFE was admitted as an intervening third party in the appeal against the decision of the Commission and, also representing the Samba Team, was one of the only two interveners to remain active in the proceedings from start to end. It provided strong evidence in court thanks to the effort volunteers like Andrew Tridgell, Jeremy Allison, Volker Lendeke and their lawyer, Carlo Piana. The case is now considered one of the leading cases in European antitrust.
 World Intellectual Property Organization: The World Intellectual Property Organization (WIPO) is one of 16 specialized agencies of the United Nations system of organisations. Its role is to administer 24 international treaties dealing with different aspects of limited monopolies on knowledge. As an observer to WIPO and together with a global coalition of other players with similar goals, FSFE is working towards reshaping it as a "World Intellectual Wealth Organisation."
FSFE Legal Team (previously known as the Freedom Task Force): The legal branch of FSFE that helps individuals, projects, businesses and government agencies find Free Software legal information, experts and support. FSFE Legal provides compliance, best practice, procurement and governance resources in-house, in partnership with FSFE's associate organisations and through its extensive network of contacts (including the Legal Network). Its mission is to spread knowledge, solve problems and encourage the long-term growth of Free Software. The FSFE Legal Team is also responsible for maintaining the Fiduciary License Agreement, a balanced Contributor License Agreement that makes sure the project remains Free Software.
The REUSE Software: This project provides a consistent way to add licensing and copyright information to the source code of a project. It is based on the SPDX license identifier and allows automating many processes involved in licensing compliance. REUSE is currently being adopted by many big open source projects, for example KDE.

Each month, FSFE publishes a newsletter, in multiple languages (including English, French, German, Italian, and Spanish), of their activities that can be mentioned in public.

Structure
From FSFE's published "Self-Conception":
"The people of the Free Software Foundation Europe (FSFE), see ourselves as Europeans
      developing a common culture of co-operation from a regional to a global level.

      We form a non-profit non-governmental organisation and network that itself is part of
      a global network of people with common goals and visions. We are not representative for
      anyone but ourselves and our work. Our common work and dedication to freedom in all
      aspects of digital society is what defines us."

Internally, the FSFE has a consensus-oriented, team structure in which participation is determined by each person's willingness to participate and do work. A democratic and representative-democratic model functions as a fallback for when the consensus-based approach either reaps no results or a quick decision is needed.

Legal structure
The FSFE has a modular legal structure with a central "Hub" organisation and the possibility of local legal bodies, called "chapters". The Hub is a charitable association ("e.V.") which is registered in Germany.

As well as being in regular contact with the other FSFs — FSF, Free Software Foundation India (FSFI), Free Software Foundation Latin America (FSFLA) — FSFE has a structure of organizations which are official associates. These are mostly national-level free software groups.

Awards
In 2010, FSFE received the Theodor Heuss Medal in recognition of its work for freedom in the information society. The medal is awarded once a year in Stuttgart by a non-partisan foundation named after West Germany's first president.

See also

 European Committee for Interoperable Systems
 OpenForum Europe

References

External links

 

Free Software Foundation
Digital rights organizations
Information technology organizations based in Europe
Non-profit organisations based in Hamburg
Organizations established in 2001